Guilford Courthouse National Military Park, at 2332 New Garden Road in Greensboro, Guilford County, North Carolina, commemorates the Battle of Guilford Court House, fought on March 15, 1781.  This battle opened the campaign that led to American victory in the Revolutionary War.  The loss by the British in this battle contributed to their surrender at Yorktown seven months later. The battlefield is preserved as a National Military Park and operated by the National Park Service (NPS). Based on research of historical evidence, the interpretation of the battle has changed since the late 20th century, which will affect the placement of monuments and markers.

Battlefield preservation
In 1886, local resident David Schenck initiated plans to gain control of land to commemorate the Guilford Courthouse battleground as a park.  The following year, he chartered the non-profit Guilford Battle Ground Company (GBGC) to advance such efforts. From an early date, he planned on the group's donating the property it purchased to the federal government.  When the US Congress finally established Guilford Courthouse as a national military park in 1917, the GBGC turned over its  at no charge.  Without David Schenck's generosity, it is entirely possible that the park would not exist today.

Although generous in starting the park, the years of control by the GBGC left a mixed legacy. First, Schenck did not preserve the terrain in its approximate historical state, but beautified the landscape for a pleasing experience. Before the grounds were established as a military park, state historical societies began to erect monuments in the area purchased by the GBGC. Although well-meant, these monuments and interpretations were not based on researched evidence and were often constructed in convenient, if inaccurate, locations.

Second, he adopted an interpretation of the battle that encompassed a much smaller area than is indicated by contemporary accounts. Historians believe his limited funds, coupled with landowners' demanding top dollar, influenced his interpretation. This mis-led researchers and historical groups who relied on his work; they placed historical monuments and markers in the wrong spots. It also hampered government efforts to acquire land or resist development in areas outside the original area designated as battleground by Schenck.  Since his time, the expanding city of Greensboro approached and encircled the park with private development, destroying some battlefield areas. When the National Park Service assumed responsibility for the park, their historians and researchers sought to clarify the accuracy of the locations of the battle.  The renewed accuracy places many of the monuments in locations that had very little reference to the actual battle.

Today, the National Park Service has moved beyond Schenck's interpretation of the battle with a more researched understanding of the battle's events.  It hopes to reconstruct the battlefield and its monuments to be consistent with historical evidence. A revived Guilford Battleground Company supports preservation efforts for Guilford Courthouse National Military Park and Colonial Heritage Center, where British forces assembled for their advance.

The park is linked by a bicycle path to the adjoining Greensboro Country Park, and residents use both for jogging and cycling.

Administrative history
The military park was established on March 2, 1917.  It was transferred from the War Department to the National Park Service August 10, 1933.  As with all historic areas administered by the National Park Service, the military park was listed on the National Register of Historic Places in 1966, when it was established.  The park's nomination was substantially updated in 1996, and in 2001 it was designated a National Historic Landmark.

See also
 Battle of Guilford Court House
 Guilford Court House, North Carolina
 Hoskins House Historic District
 List of National Historic Landmarks in North Carolina
 National Register of Historic Places listings in Guilford County, North Carolina

References

Sources
 The National Parks: Index 2001-2003. Washington: U.S. Department of the Interior.
 [http://www.nps.gov/guco/adhi/adhi.htm Redeemed From Oblivion]: An Administrative History of Guilford Courthouse National Military Park. (1995) Washington: U.S. Department of the Interior.

External links

 Guilford Courthouse National Military Park, Official Website, National Park Service
 "Virtual Tour", Guilford Courthouse Military Park, National Park Service
 Guilford Courthouse: A Pivotal Battle in the War for Independence, a National Park Service Teaching with Historic Places (TwHP) lesson plan
 "Guilford Battleground Company", Official Website for supporters of the park

American Revolutionary War sites
National Battlefields and Military Parks of the United States
National Historic Landmarks in North Carolina
Military facilities on the National Register of Historic Places in North Carolina
Geography of Greensboro, North Carolina
Museums in Greensboro, North Carolina
Military and war museums in North Carolina
Colonial Revival architecture in North Carolina
American Revolutionary War museums
Protected areas established in 1917
National Park Service areas in North Carolina
Tourist attractions in Greensboro, North Carolina
Protected areas of Guilford County, North Carolina
National Register of Historic Places in Guilford County, North Carolina
Historic districts on the National Register of Historic Places in North Carolina
1917 establishments in North Carolina
American Revolution on the National Register of Historic Places
Courthouses on the National Register of Historic Places in North Carolina
Conflict sites on the National Register of Historic Places in North Carolina
Parks on the National Register of Historic Places in North Carolina